Manuel Antín (born February 27, 1926) is an Argentine film director and screenwriter.

Manuel Antín was born in Las Palmas, Chaco Province, in 1926. He first wrote for Argentine television in 1956 and made his directorial debut in 1962 with his first film: La cifra impar (Odd Number), based on a story by Julio Cortázar, (Cartas de mamá). The film The Venerable Ones earned him a Golden Palm nomination at the Cannes Film Festival, and his Circe (1964), a Golden Bear nomination at the 14th Berlin International Film Festival. Perhaps his best-known film, the bucolic Don Segundo Sombra (1969), earned him a second Golden Palm nomination at Cannes.

In 1983 he was designated as director of the Instituto Nacional de Cine in the government of Raúl Alfonsín.

In 1991 he founded the Universidad del Cine, an institution devoted to film teaching and production.

Filmography 
La Invitación (1982)
Allá lejos y hace tiempo (Far Away and Long Ago) (1978)
La Sartén por el mango (In the Driver's Seat) (1972)
Juan Manuel de Rosas (1972)
Don Segundo Sombra (1969)
Castigo al traidor (Punishment to the Traitor) (1966)
Psique y sexo (segment "La Estrella del desierto") (1965)
Intimidad de los parques (1965)
Circe (1964)
La Cifra impar (Odd Number) (1962)
Los Venerables todos (The Venerable Ones) (1962)

References

External links 

1926 births
Living people
Argentine film directors
Argentine screenwriters
Male screenwriters
Argentine male writers
Argentine people of French descent
People from Las Palmas, Chaco